Gordon Gilbert Kennedy (born 22 February 1958) is a Scottish actor, presenter and narrator.  He starred in the Channel 4 sketch show Absolutely, and appeared in BBC drama series Robin Hood and Red Cap.

Biography
Kennedy grew up in Tranent, East Lothian, and attended George Watson's College in Edinburgh. He then studied at the Scottish School of PE at Jordanhill College (now part of the University of Strathclyde). In 2015 he was announced as the first patron of The Fraser Centre Community Trust in Tranent.
He also studied for one year at Scott Sutherland School of Architecture, Garthdee, Aberdeen around 1984.

Career

He first rose to prominence in the sketch show Absolutely and "progressed downwards to co-host" the 'original' National Lottery show, alongside Anthea Turner, as well as appearing as himself in a Punt and Dennis spoof of Bugs entitled Plugs as the antagonist who rigs the lottery results to win £100 million on an eight-week rollover. He has appeared in several dramas, including the role of Sergeant Bruce Hornsby in the BBC drama, Red Cap. He has also appeared in the BBC Scotland soap River City.

From 2006 to 2009 he starred as Little John in all three series of the BBC production of Robin Hood.

From 2010 to 2012, Kennedy narrated the British edition of Kitchen Nightmares encompassing 26 episodes, replacing the US narrators J.V. Martin and Arthur Smith for the UK.

Sports
Alongside his acting career, Kennedy is a rugby coach with London Wasps. He has also appeared many times on Test Match Sofa.  His elder brother Euan Kennedy played rugby union for Scotland winning 4 caps between 1983 and 1984.

Filmography

Film

Television

Theatre
 Rocky Horror Show (1990/91) – Eddie/Dr Scott.
 Full House (2002) - Tim.
 The Hairless Diva (2002) - Mr Smith.
 The Corstorphine Road Nativity (2009) – Narrator.
 The James Plays (2014) – Murdac Stewart/Livingston/John
 The Audience (2015) - Gordon Brown

Radio
 The Absolutely Radio Show.
 Mordrin McDonald: 21st-Century Wizard.
  Mrs Sidhu Investigates - Mrs Sidhu's Deadly Highland Game.

Awards and nominations

References

External links
 
 Gordon Kennedy Interview at the BBC website
 Biography on Absolutely.biz
 
 

1958 births
Living people
People educated at George Watson's College
People from Tranent
Scottish male television actors
Scottish male comedians
Scottish television presenters
Scottish television personalities
Scottish comedians
Scottish male radio actors
Scottish male stage actors
Scottish male film actors